National Aerospace Development Administration (NADA) is the official space agency of North Korea, succeeding the Korean Committee of Space Technology (KCST). It was founded on April 1, 2013.

The current basis for the activities of NADA is the Law on Space Development, in 2014 the 7th session of the 12th Supreme People's Assembly was passed. The Act sets out the North Korean principles of peaceful development of space determines compliance with the principles of the Juche ideology (North Korean ideology) and independence, as well as the aim of solving scientific and technological problems of space to improve the economy, science and technology.

The law also regulates the position of the NADA and the principles of notification, security, research and possibly compensation in relation to satellite launches. The law calls for cooperation with international organizations and other countries, the principle of equality and mutual benefit, respect for international law and international regulations for space. The law also opposes the militarization of space.

Korean Committee of Space Technology

In 1980, KCST, the Executive Space Agency of North Korea, started research and development with the aim of producing and placing communications satellites, earth observation satellites and weather observation satellites.

International legal regime of the DPRK's space activities
In 2009, the DPRK entered to the Treaty on Principles Governing the Activities of States in the Exploration and Use of Outer Space, including the Moon and other celestial bodies in, and the Convention on Registration of Objects Launched into Outer Space Objects.

Logo
The emblem of NADA consists of a dark blue globe with the word Kukgaujugaebalkuk (National Space Development Administration) in white Korean letters on the bottom, DPRK (Democratic People's Republic of Korea) in light blue letters on the top, the constellation of Ursa Major, NADA in white letters in the middle, and two bright blue rings symbolizing satellite orbits and the intention of place on all orbits of satellites. The logo is described as representing the agency's "character, mission, position, and development prospect". Ursa Major is intended to symbolize and glorify North Korea as a space power.

The Western media point out that the logo strikingly resembles to NASA's logo — both with blue globes, white lettering, stars, and swooshed rings.

Space Launch Vehicles

Paektusan-1

North Korea's first orbital space launch vehicle. Based on the Moksong-1 ICBM called Taepodong-1 in the West.

Unha-1, Unha-2, Unha-3 and Kwangmyŏngsŏng (Unha-4)

Designed to compete with South Korea's KSLV-I.
The Unha is a North Korean family of expendable carrier rockets. The Unha-1, Unha-2, Unha-3 and Unha-4 (Kwangmyŏngsŏng) partially utilize the same delivery system as the Moksong-2 ICBM (known as Taepodong-2 long-range ballistic missile in the West).

Unha-9

Designed to compete with South Korea's KSLV-II, it will be able to place 1 ton into GSO.
Partially utilize the same delivery system as the Moksong-3 ICBM (known as Taepodong-3 long-range ballistic missile in the West).

Crewed Unha

Designed to compete with South Korea's KSLV-III, it will be able to place 8 tons into LEO. Similar to the Chinese CZ-2F, this version based on an up-rated Unha-9 with additional strap-on boosters would double the liftoff thrust, suitable for placing a crewed capsuled spacecraft.

Unha-20

Designed to compete with South Korea's KSLV-IV, the future Unha-20 will be able to place 20 tons into LEO.

Solid-fuel launcher
Based on the diameter of the flame exhaust bucket of 10m on the Tonghae Launch Complex 3 built and never finished, a larger booster with a diameter of 4.5m, thus equivalent to the Iranian solid propellant Qaem is still awaiting its inaugural launch.

Launch history
This is a list of satellites launched.

North Korea's Deep Space Exploration Program 
Designed to compete with South Korea's KSLV-IV, the future Unha-20 will be able to place 20 tons into LEO. It will be used also in the North Korean Deep Space Exploration Program that includes the Moon, Mars and beyond.

North Korean Lunar Exploration Program (: NKLEP)

North Korean lunar orbiter
The first phase of the NKLEP. South Korean internet paper Jaju Minbo carried an article on March 23, 2012, that North Korea is likely to launch a lunar explorer satellite.

North Korean lunar lander
The second phase of the NKLEP after orbiting. In an interview with The Associated Press, a senior official said on Aug. 4, 2016, that the North Koreans will start designing lunar orbiter and lunar lander immediately after launching a GEO communication satellite as planned in the Second Space Development Five-Year Plan.
The development and completion of the Paektusan-1 rocket engine was an epoch-making event that advanced the moon exploration plan.

North Korea stated its ambition to land a probe on the Moon.

North Korean lunar sample-return mission
Prerequisite paving the way for any crewed moon landing, the third phase of the NKLEP after orbiting and landing would be to return rock samples to the Earth with a robotic probe.
Already illustrated back in 2015's Pyongyang Science-Technology Complex, by a schematics of the orbital trajectory of the North Korean Lunar Exploration Program Phase III, the lunar sample-return mission. 
Launched with a heavy Unha-20 booster able to place it into a LTO, sometime after 2026. Splash landing of the return capsule in the Pacific Ocean.

North Korean Mars Exploration Program (: NKMEP)
Hyon Kwang Il, director of the scientific research department of North Korea's National Aerospace Development Administration, said that North Korea also intends "to do manned spaceflight and scientific experiments in space, make a flight to the moon and moon exploration and also exploration to other planets."

Future projects

In 2009 the DPRK announced more ambitious future space projects including its own crewed space flights, a space station and the development of a crewed partially reusable shuttle launch vehicle mockup of that was deployed in Mangyongdae Children's Palace.

In 2016, Hyon Kwang Il, director of NADA's scientific research department, said they planned to launch more satellites before 2020, including a geostationary satellite. He also said that he hoped they would "plant the flag of the DPRK on the moon" within 10 years.

In 2017, NADA officials unveiled two proposals for upcoming satellites.  One of which is an Earth remote-exploration satellite weighing in class over 100 kg with spatial resolution of several meters.  The second being a satellite with a proposed geostationary orbit for communication with an estimated weight of at least 1 short ton. Various media outlets have reported that North Korea was in the process of completing one of the two satellites, dubbed "Kwangmyongsong-5", however the expected launch date is yet to be determined.

See also

 Korean Committee of Space Technology
 List of space agencies
 List of government space agencies

References

Space agencies
Space program of North Korea
2014 establishments in North Korea
Government agencies established in 2014